Gheynarjeh (also known as Qinerja) is a village in Khondab Rural District, in the Central District of Khondab County, Markazi Province, Iran. At the 2006 census, its population was 801, in 199 families.

References 

Populated places in Khondab County